Daniela Regula Schwarz (born 9 September 1985) is a Swiss football defender, playing for Norwegian Toppserien club Vålerenga. She previously played for Grasshopper Club Zürich of the Nationalliga A. Since her debut in July 2009, a 5–0 defeat by the Netherlands, she has been a member of the Switzerland national team.

A product of the America college soccer system, Schwarz attended Lindsey Wilson and also played in the North American W-League for F.C. Indiana and Toronto Lady Lynx. After returning to Switzerland and playing for Grasshopper Club Zürich, she moved to Norway in 2012 with Kolbotn.

References

External links

Profile at Lindsey Wilson College

1985 births
Living people
Swiss women's footballers
Lindsey Wilson Blue Raiders women's soccer players
Expatriate women's footballers in Norway
Expatriate women's soccer players in the United States
Swiss expatriate women's footballers
Toppserien players
Kolbotn Fotball players
Vålerenga Fotball Damer players
USL W-League (1995–2015) players
Switzerland women's international footballers
Swiss expatriate sportspeople in Norway
Grasshopper Club Zürich (women) players
Swiss Women's Super League players
Women's association football defenders
F.C. Indiana players
2015 FIFA Women's World Cup players